The 2017 Newcastle Knights season was the 30th in the club's history. Coached by Nathan Brown and captained by Trent Hodkinson, before being replaced by Sione Mata'utia and Jamie Buhrer in the captaincy role, they competed in the NRL's 2017 Telstra Premiership, finishing the regular season in 16th place (out of 16).

Milestones
 Round 1: Jamie Buhrer made his debut for the club, after previously playing for the Manly Warringah Sea Eagles.
 Round 1: Ken Sio made his debut for the club, after previously playing for the Hull Kingston Rovers.
 Round 1: Josh Starling made his debut for the club, after previously playing for the Manly Warringah Sea Eagles.
 Round 1: Jack Stockwell scored his 1st try for the club.
 Round 1: Sam Stone made his NRL debut for the club.
 Round 1: Luke Yates made his NRL debut for the club.
 Round 2: Sam Stone scored his 1st career try.
 Round 3: Brock Lamb kicked his 1st career goal.
 Round 3: Ken Sio scored his 1st try for the club.
 Round 4: Joe Wardle made his NRL debut for the club, after previously playing for the Huddersfield Giants.
 Round 5: Jacob Gagan made his debut for the club, after previously playing for the Cronulla-Sutherland Sharks and scored his 1st try for the club.
 Round 5: Sione Mata'utia played his 50th career game.
 Round 5: Anthony Tupou made his debut for the club, after previously playing for the Cronulla-Sutherland Sharks.
 Round 5: Joe Wardle scored his 1st try for the club.
 Round 8: Sione Mata'utia captained his 1st game for the club.
 Round 10: Brock Lamb scored his 1st career try.
 Round 14: Jaelen Feeney scored his 1st career try.
 Round 18: Jamie Buhrer captained his 1st game for the club.
 Round 20: Trent Hodkinson played his 150th career game.
 Round 20: Shaun Kenny-Dowall made his debut for the club, after previously playing for the Sydney Roosters, and scored his 1st try for the club.
 Round 25: Jamie Buhrer scored his 1st try for the club.

Squad

Transfers and Re-signings

Gains

Losses

Promoted juniors

Change of role

Re-signings

Player contract situations

Ladder

Jerseys and sponsors
In 2017, the Knights' jerseys were made by ISC and their major sponsor was nib Health Funds.

Fixtures

Auckland Nines

Squad: 1. Peter Mata'utia 2. Ken Sio 3. Brendan Elliot 4. Nathan Ross 5. Cory Denniss 6. Brock Lamb 7. Jaelen Feeney 8. Daniel Saifiti 9. Danny Levi 10. Jacob Saifiti 11. Mitchell Barnett 12. Jamie Buhrer (c) 13. Luke Yates 14. Tyler Randell 15. Jack Stockwell 16. Sam Stone 17. Lachlan Fitzgibbon 18. Nick Meaney 19. Sione Mata'utia (Emergency Player)

Preseason  trials

Regular season

Statistics

31 players used.

Source:

Representative honours

The following players appeared in a representative match in 2017.

Australia
Dane Gagai

Australian Schoolboys
Luke Huth (squad member)

Cook Islands
Sam Mataora

Fiji
Michael Potter (coach)
Daniel Saifiti
Jacob Saifiti

Indigenous All Stars
Dane Gagai

Italy
Jack Johns

Junior Kangaroos
Sam Stone

New South Wales City
Pauli Pauli
Nathan Ross

New South Wales Residents
Josh King (18th man)
Nick Meaney (19th man)

New South Wales under-16s
Bradman Best
Harry Croker
Cooper Jenkins
Jaron Purcell (captain)

New South Wales under-20s
Nick Meaney

New Zealand
Danny Levi

Prime Minister's XIII
Dane Gagai

Queensland
Dane Gagai

Samoa
Peter Mata'utia
Sione Mata'utia

Scotland
Joe Wardle (train-on squad)

World All Stars
Sione Mata'utia

Individual honours

Teams and squads
Intrust Super Premiership New South Wales Team of the Year
 Tom Hughes

Newcastle Knights awards

Player of the Year
 National Rugby League (NRL) Player of the Year: Mitchell Barnett
 Intrust Super Premiership NSW Player of the Year: Nick Meaney
 National Youth Competition (NYC) Player of the Year: Zac Hosking

Players' Player
 National Rugby League (NRL) Players' Player: Daniel Saifiti
 Intrust Super Premiership NSW Players' Player: Tom Hughes
 National Youth Competition (NYC) Players' Player: Matt Cooper

Coach's Award
 National Rugby League (NRL) Coach's Award: Jamie Buhrer
 Intrust Super Premiership NSW Coach's Award: Braden Robson
 National Youth Competition (NYC) Coach's Award: Heath Gibbs

References

Newcastle Knights seasons
Newcastle Knights season